West Wyalong is the main town of the Bland Shire in the Riverina region of New South Wales, Australia.

The West Wyalong district is the largest cereal-growing centre in NSW. Eucalyptus oil production started in 1907 and the West Wyalong area became one of the major world exporters of the product.

History 
The Wiradjuri people were the first to inhabit this region. (Wiradjuri northern dialect pronunciation [wiraːjd̪uːraj]) or Wirraayjuurray people (Wiradjuri southern dialect pronunciation [wiraːjɟuːraj]) are a group of indigenous Australian Aboriginal people that were united by a common language, strong ties of kinship and survived as skilled hunter–fisher–gatherers in family groups or clans scattered throughout central New South Wales.

In the 21st century, major Wiradjuri groups live in Condobolin, Peak Hill, Narrandera and Griffith. There are significant populations at Wagga Wagga and Leeton and smaller groups at West Wyalong, Parkes, Dubbo, Forbes, Cootamundra, Cowra and Young.

Gold was discovered at Wyalong in September 1893 by Joseph Neeld. In 1895 West Wyalong was developed  from Wyalong around the bullock track, without the benefit of town planning, resulting in curious kinks in the road where it avoided trees. As well as the mines, the White Tank water supply was located here. This is now the location of McCann Park. The goldfield was declared the most productive in the colony in 1899.

As mining declined West Wyalong became the main service centre for agriculture in the surrounding district, although for many years there was rivalry between the towns. Both towns wanted the Temora railway line, but settled on a compromise of a station midway between the two towns, called Wyalong Central.

Development since the 1970s has expanded Wyalong in the direction of West Wyalong with several motels built at Central Wyalong. A shared bicycle and pedestrian track was constructed in 1994 to link Wyalong with West Wyalong.

The population has stabilised recently. This is due, in part, to the Cowal Gold Mine adjacent to Lake Cowal, 45 km northeast and Pace Farm's egg production facility.

Climate

West Wyalong has long, sweltering summers and cool winters with extended overcast periods not uncommon, typical of lower Outback New South Wales.

Places of interest 
 The Poppet Head
 Lions Park Dakota DC3
 West Wyalong Museum
 West Wyalong Airport
 Easel sculpture of West Wyalong (Drysdale)
 Wyalong Wetlands
 Tivoli Theatre

Schools 
 St Mary's War Memorial Catholic School (K-6) - The original St. Mary's Church School was built in 1901 of corrugated iron and staffed by the Sisters of Mercy. By 1903 there were 167 students. The present St. Mary's School was built in 1961.
 West Wyalong Primary School (K-6)
 West Wyalong High School (7-12)
 Wyalong Public School (K-6)

Pubs and clubs in West Wyalong 

 The Tattersalls Hotel
 The Metropolitan Hotel
 Royal Hotel
 The White Tank Hotel
 West Wyalong Services & Citizens Club
 West Wyalong Lawn Bowling Club
 West Wyalong Golf Club
 Toppy Pub (Wyalong)

Sport 
The town hosts a number of different sports club, catering for both adults and junior players.   
 
 West Wyalong Mallee Men - rugby league and competes in the Maher Cup.
 West Wyalong-Girral Bulldogs - Australian rules football & netball and competes in the Northern Riverina Football League in Seniors and Under 17's, U/14's and U/11's.
 West Wyalong Weevils - senior rugby union
 West Wyalong Pirates - junior rugby union
 West Wyalong Wildcats - (basketball)
 Alleena Cricket Club - cricket
 Tallimba Cricket Club - cricket
 White Tank Cricket Club - cricket

Annual Shows and Events

January
 Australia Day Breakfast and Awards (26th), West Wyalong 
 David Earl Memorial Cricket Match, West Wyalong

February
 Pancake Breakfast, West Wyalong
 West Wyalong Rugby League Knockout (Last Fri./Sat.)
 Dean Wood Big Gig

March
 Barmedman Modified tractor Pull (1st Sat.)
 Candy Stripe Fair, West Wyalong

April
 ANZAC Day Celebrations (25th)
 Wellness West Wyalong Festival
 Ladies Day Out in West Wyalong

May
 Mother's Day Luncheon (2nd Sun.), West Wyalong
 Masonic Debutante Ball (2nd Sat.), West Wyalong

July
 Catholic Debutante Ball, West Wyalong

August
 Weethalle Show (3rd Sat.)
 West Wyalong Show Ball

September
 Barmedman Show & Beaut-Ute Comp. (1st Sat./Sun.)
 West Wyalong Show (1st Wed.)
 Ungarie Show (2nd Fri.)
 West Wyalong Charity Campdraft

October
 Mirrool Silo Kick Challenge (2nd Sat.)
 'in the West' Festival www.inthewest.com.au

November
 Early Markets (1st Sat.), Wyalong

December
 Christmas Market/Carols by Candlelight, West Wyalong
 New year Celebrations & Bi-annual Fireworks, West Wyalong

Notable people from the area 
 Dymphna Cusack, author
 Reginald Roy Rattey, Victoria Cross recipient
 Terry Gathercole, champion swimmer
 Mark O'Meley, rugby league footballer
 Scott Staniforth, rugby union footballer
 Mat McLachlan, author and historian
 Anthony Gelling, rugby union representatives
 Neale Daniher , former AFL footballer, former AFL coach and motor neurone disease campaigner
 Terry Daniher, former AFL footballer
 Anthony Daniher, former AFL footballer
 Chris Daniher, former AFL footballer
 Dal Stivens, author - grew up in the town
 Danny Meagher, Catholic bishop

Gallery

Media 
The West Wyalong Advocate newspaper is an independent publication, printed on Fridays. It also services nearby towns including Ungarie and Barmedman.

94.5 GOLD FM is West Wyalong's community radio station. It is an independent not-for-profit community broadcaster founded in 2001.

West Wyalong Movies is a project by Ross Harmer aimed at documenting the history of West Wyalong and The Bland Shire.

Surrounding towns

References

External links

Bland Shire Council

Towns in New South Wales
Towns in the Central West (New South Wales)
Newell Highway